Trebilcock is a Cornish surname, pronounced "tra-BILL-co". It derives from Trebilcock in the parish of Roche; Trebilcock is formed from the elements "tre" (homestead) and a mutated form of ME "pilicock" (darling).

Notable people with the surname include:

 John Trebilcock (born 1973), American politician 
 Mike Trebilcock (born 1944), retired professional footballer
 Michael Trebilcock (born 1941), lawyer from New Zealand

Footnotes

Cornish-language surnames